Djibouti participated in the 2010 Summer Youth Olympics in Singapore.

The Djibouti team consisted of 4 athletes competing in 2 sports: athletics and swimming.

Athletics

Boys
Track and Road Events

Girls
Track and Road Events

Swimming

References

External links
Competitors List: Djibouti

Nations at the 2010 Summer Youth Olympics
You
Djibouti at the Youth Olympics